The 1999 German Grand Prix (formally the Grosser Mobil 1 Preis von Deutschland 1999) was a Formula One motor race held on 1 August 1999 at the Hockenheimring near Hockenheim, Germany. It was the tenth race of the 1999 FIA Formula One World Championship. With Michael Schumacher out injured, Eddie Irvine took a second successive victory as he chased the championship, aided by stand-in team-mate Mika Salo moving over to give him the lead. In the early laps Finnish drivers ran first and second. However, Mika Häkkinen ultimately crashed out on lap 25 due to a tyre failure, allowing Heinz-Harald Frentzen to finish third in his home Grand Prix.

Damon Hill was again rumoured to be leaving Formula One when he allegedly retired a healthy car. Hill claimed that his Jordan had brake problems. Eddie Irvine gave his winner's trophy to Mika Salo, who was leading towards the end of the race and moved over on team orders.

Classification

Qualifying

Race

Championship standings after the race

Drivers' Championship standings

Constructors' Championship standings

References

German Grand Prix
German Grand Prix
Grand Prix
August 1999 sports events in Europe